The Episcopal Diocese of Albany is a diocese of the Episcopal Church covering 19 counties in northeastern New York state. It was created in 1868 from a division of the Episcopal Diocese of New York.

History

The Church of England arrived in 1674 with a chaplain assigned to the British military garrison at Albany. In 1704 the Society for the Propagation of the Gospel sent two missionaries to the Mohawk Valley, where the first Anglican church was erected in 1711.

In 1708 the oldest parish, St. Peter's, was founded in Albany. He extended his ministry to nearby Schenectady, and by 1763, St. George's Church was built in that town. In 1765 the last of the colonial parishes, St. John's in Johnstown, was established. By the beginning of the American Revolutionary War, Anglican missions were springing up in surrounding counties. However, the war proved disastrous to the English church, which for almost ten years after remained leaderless and disorganized.

With the formation of the Episcopal Diocese of New York in 1785 (comprising the entire state), the Church in New York began to reorganize. By 1790, during the "Second Great Awakening", expanded missionary activity begun under strong episcopal leadership was largely sustained by a vigorous laity. By 1810, 14 priests served 25 parishes in buildings made possible by grants from Trinity Parish, New York City.

In 1868, nineteen counties in the northeastern quarter of the state were organized into the Diocese of Albany. Its first bishop, William Croswell Doane, was elected in 1869 by a convention of 62 priests and 127 delegates. Doane's principles and personality had a profound and enduring effect upon the character of the Diocese of Albany. He organized the newly formed diocese after the English model with a cathedral see, and his "high church" leanings found expression in his establishment of St. Agnes School, The Child's Hospital, a community of women religious, and St. Margaret's House and Hospital for Babies.

In 2007, the 8th bishop of Albany, Dan Herzog, several months after his retirement, renounced his ordained ministry and was received into communion with the Roman Catholic Church. He was, at the time, only the third bishop in the history of the Episcopal Church to do so. Herzog had since 2003 been an increasingly vocal critic of some decisions of the Episcopal Church's General Convention, including its 2003 affirmation of the election of a non-celibate gay bishop, Gene Robinson, in the Diocese of New Hampshire. However, following a period of further reflection, Herzog rescinded his renunciation, and Presiding Bishop Katharine Jefferts Schori, with the advice and consent of her Advisory Council, restored him to the ministry of the Episcopal Church with effect from April 28, 2010. Herzog will assist his successor in the Diocese of Albany in the capacity of a retired bishop. Jefferts Schori visited the Episcopal Diocese of Albany in 2011.

William H. Love was the most recent bishop of Albany. He was elected bishop coadjutor in 2006 and installed in February 2007 following Herzog's retirement. He is self-identified as orthodox and is considered to be theologically conservative. Love was the only Episcopal bishop in New York State to oppose the passage of the Marriage Equality Act.  In October 2020, Love was found to have violated Episcopal Church doctrine and rules due to his unwillingness to permit same-sex unions to be blessed by clergy within the Albany diocese. In response to that finding, Love resigned from his position as bishop on February 1, 2021. Four priests and four deacons left the Albany Diocese in protest following Love's departure. After Love's departure, Michael G. Smith, former bishop of North Dakota, was appointed as assisting bishop while the diocese searches for a new leader.

Companion dioceses
  The Diocese of Down and Dromore is part of the Church of Ireland and is located in North East Ireland. The diocese covers half of Belfast, the capital of Northern Ireland, east of the River Lagan, as well as County Armagh east of the River Bann. The cathedral and administrative offices are in Belfast.
 The Diocese of Maridi is located in South Sudan. The diocese is part of the Episcopal Church of Sudan.
  The Diocese of Northern Argentina is located in northern Argentina and is part of the Anglican Church of South America.

List of bishops

List of suffragan bishops

Historic churches in the diocese
Historic churches in the diocese include:
All Saints Episcopal Church, Round Lake, 1892.
Christ Episcopal Church (Duanesburg, New York), 1793
Church of the Good Shepherd (Cullen, New York), 1892
Church of the Good Shepherd (Raquette Lake, New York), 1880
Church of St. John the Evangelist (Hunter, New York) 1885
Church of the Transfiguration (Blue Mountain Lake, New York), 1885
Emmanuel Episcopal Church (Little Falls, New York), 1835
St. Andrew's Episcopal Church (Albany, New York), 1931
St. George’s Episcopal Church 
(Schenectady New York),1735
St. John's Church Complex (Delhi, New York), 1831
St. John's Episcopal Church (Johnstown, New York), 1837
St. Mark's Episcopal Church (Hoosick Falls, New York), 1860
St. Mary's Episcopal Church (Springfield Center, New York), 1889
St. Paul's Episcopal Church (Troy, New York), 1828
St. Peter's Episcopal Church (Albany, New York), 1876
St. Stephen's Episcopal Church (Schuylerville, New York), 1838
Trinity Episcopal Church (Ashland, New York), 1879
Trinity Episcopal Church-Fairfield, 1808
Trinity Episcopal Church (Potsdam, New York), 1835
Zion Episcopal Church Complex, 1800

See also
Cathedral of All Saints, Albany, New York
List of bishops of the Episcopal Church in the United States of America

References

External links

Journal of the Annual Convention, Diocese of Albany

1868 establishments in New York (state)
Anglican dioceses established in the 19th century
Anglo-Catholicism
Albany
Episcopal Church in New York (state)
Province 2 of the Episcopal Church (United States)
Religious organizations established in 1868